Copelatus variegatus is a species of diving beetle. It is part of the subfamily Copelatinae in the family Dytiscidae. It was described by Régimbart in 1895.

References

variegatus
Beetles described in 1895